The 1995 Masters Tournament was the 59th Masters Tournament, held April 6–9 at Augusta National Golf Club in Augusta, Georgia. Ben Crenshaw won his second Masters championship, one stroke ahead of runner-up Davis Love III. It was an emotional victory for Crenshaw as it came just days after the death of his mentor, Harvey Penick. Crenshaw and Tom Kite attended the funeral in Texas on Wednesday and did not return to Augusta until that night, on the eve of the first round.

The 1995 Masters marked the first major championship for Tiger Woods, who qualified as the 1994 U.S. Amateur champion. A 19-year-old college freshman at Stanford, he tied for 41st place and was the leading amateur, the only one to make the cut. Woods' average driving distance was the longest in the tournament.

Field
1. Masters champions
Seve Ballesteros (9), Gay Brewer, Billy Casper, Charles Coody, Fred Couples (10,12,13), Ben Crenshaw (9,13), Nick Faldo (3,11,12), Raymond Floyd (9), Doug Ford, Bernhard Langer, Sandy Lyle, Larry Mize (9), Jack Nicklaus, José María Olazábal (11,12,13), Arnold Palmer, Gary Player, Craig Stadler, Tom Watson (9,10), Ian Woosnam, Fuzzy Zoeller (13)

Tommy Aaron, George Archer, Jack Burke Jr., Bob Goalby, Ben Hogan, Herman Keiser, Cary Middlecoff, Byron Nelson, Henry Picard, Gene Sarazen, Sam Snead, and Art Wall Jr. did not play.

2. U.S. Open champions (last five years)
Ernie Els (9,13), Hale Irwin (9,12,13), Lee Janzen (12), Tom Kite (9,13), Payne Stewart

3. The Open champions (last five years)
Ian Baker-Finch (9), Greg Norman (9,10,11,13), Nick Price (4,12,13)

4. PGA champions (last five years)
Paul Azinger, John Daly (12), Wayne Grady

5. U.S. Amateur champion and runner-up
Trip Kuehne (a), Tiger Woods (a)

6. The Amateur champion
Lee S. James (a)

7. U.S. Amateur Public Links champion
Guy Yamamoto (a)

8. U.S. Mid-Amateur champion
Tim Jackson (a)

9. Top 24 players and ties from the 1994 Masters
Chip Beck, Brad Faxon (13), David Edwards (10), Dan Forsman, Bill Glasson (13), Jay Haas (13), John Huston (13), Tom Lehman (12,13), Jim McGovern (10), Mark O'Meara (12), Corey Pavin (11,12,13), Loren Roberts (10,12,13), Lanny Wadkins

10. Top 16 players and ties from the 1994 U.S. Open
John Cook (11), Clark Dennis, Scott Hoch (13), Steve Lowery (12,13), Jeff Maggert (13), Colin Montgomerie, Frank Nobilo, Jeff Sluman, Curtis Strange, Duffy Waldorf

11. Top eight players and ties from 1994 PGA Championship
Steve Elkington (12), Phil Mickelson (12,13)

12. Winners of PGA Tour events since the previous Masters
Mark Brooks, Bob Estes (13), Rick Fehr (13), David Frost (13), Mike Heinen, Brian Henninger, Peter Jacobsen, Neal Lancaster, Bruce Lietzke (13), Davis Love III, Mark McCumber (13), John Morse, Kenny Perry (13), Dicky Pride, Vijay Singh, Mike Springer (13), Mike Sullivan

13. Top 30 players from the 1994 PGA Tour money list
Brad Bryant, Mark Calcavecchia, Hal Sutton

14. Special foreign invitation
David Gilford, Miguel Ángel Jiménez, Mark McNulty, Tsuneyuki Nakajima, Masashi Ozaki

Round summaries

First round
Thursday, April 6, 1995

Source:

Second round
Friday, April 7, 1995

Amateurs: Woods (E), Jackson (+11), Kuehne (+11), James (+13), Yamamoto (+17)

Third round
Saturday, April 8, 1995

Final round
Sunday, April 9, 1995

Final leaderboard

Sources:

Scorecard

Cumulative tournament scores, relative to par
{|class="wikitable" span = 50 style="font-size:85%;
|-
|style="background: Red;" width=10|
|Eagle
|style="background: Pink;" width=10|
|Birdie
|style="background: PaleGreen;" width=10|
|Bogey
|style="background: Green;" width=10|
|Double bogey
|}
Source:

References

External links
GolfCompendium.com: 1995 Masters
Masters.com – Past winners and results 
Augusta.com – 1995 Masters leaderboard and scorecards

1995
1995 in golf
1995 in American sports
1995 in sports in Georgia (U.S. state)
April 1995 sports events in the United States